Neville Hunte (born 5 August 1948) is a former Guyanese cyclist. He competed in the sprint and 1000m time trial events at the 1972 Summer Olympics.

He is also president of the Guyana Cycling Association of North America, which raises money to provide equipment and training to underserved Guyanese cyclists. 

Hunte's brother Cyril is also a competitive cyclist.

References

External links
 

1948 births
Living people
Guyanese male cyclists
Olympic cyclists of Guyana
Cyclists at the 1972 Summer Olympics
Commonwealth Games competitors for Guyana
Cyclists at the 1970 British Commonwealth Games
Place of birth missing (living people)